Sue Ellen “Suzy” Hansen is a Canadian politician, who was elected to the Nova Scotia House of Assembly in the 2021 Nova Scotia general election. She represents the riding of Halifax Needham as a member of the Nova Scotia New Democratic Party.

Prior to her election, Ms. Hansen was a former board member of the Halifax Regional School Board and other boards and an active volunteer. She was also one of four Black Canadians elected to the Nova Scotia legislature in 2021.

Electoral record

References

Year of birth missing (living people)
Living people
Nova Scotia New Democratic Party MLAs
Women MLAs in Nova Scotia
21st-century Canadian politicians
21st-century Canadian women politicians
Black Canadian politicians
Black Canadian women